Gerger or Gar Gar in Iran may refer to:
 Gerger-e Olya
 Gerger-e Sofla, Kurdistan

See also
 Gargar-e Sofla (disambiguation)